Log Cabin Motel may refer to:

Log Cabin Motel (Gallup, New Mexico), formerly listed on the National Register of Historic Places in McKinley County, New Mexico
Log Cabin Motel (Pinedale, Wyoming), listed on the National Register of Historic Places in Sublette County, Wyoming